Iskra is a rural locality (a village) in Yagnitskoye Rural Settlement, Cherepovetsky District, Vologda Oblast, Russia. The population was 26 as of 2002.

Geography 
Mikheyevo is the nearest rural locality.

References 

Rural localities in Cherepovetsky District